Georg Josef Riedel (born December 16, 1949) is an Austrian glassmaker and businessman. He is the 10th-generation owner of Riedel (glass manufacturer) established in 1756 and best known for its production of grape variety-specific glassware designed to enhance types of wines based on specific properties of individual grape varieties. Georg Riedel joined the family business in 1973 serving as accountant, before rising to co-CEO of Riedel Crystal alongside his father, Professor Claus Josef Riedel, from 1987 until 1994. He served as chief executive officer from 1994 until 2013. Georg Riedel succeeded his father, who first developed the concept of wine-enhancing glassware in 1958, and is best known for bringing variety-specific wine glasses to a global audience.

Early life

Georg Josef Riedel was born in 1949 in Innsbruck, Austria to Claus J Riedel and Adia Rosa Riedel (née Parodi).

Career

 To that end, in 1991, Robert M. Parker, Jr. who described Riedel glassware in The Wine Advocate, claimed: “The finest glasses for both technical and hedonistic purposes are those made by Riedel. The effect of these glasses on fine wine is profound.”

Acquisition of Subsidiaries & Expansion

 Today Riedel has a 97% export rate confirming  their position as world leader in the production of functional glasses.

Design Innovation Timeline

 1986: Developed the Vinum Series, the first variety-specific glassware made by machine. The Vinum Series expanded on the mouthblown Sommeliers Series, Riedel Crystal's first line of variety-specific glassware, and provided an affordable glassware alternative to a growing segment of wine-drinkers in the United States, which increased by 12% between 1980 and 1990.
 1989: Developed the Ouverture Series, positioned as the entry level variety-specific glass for wine drinkers who appreciate good, reasonably priced wine.
 2000: Developed the Vinum Extreme Series, Riedel's first collection of glasses designed specifically for New World wines.
 2007: Developed Tyrol, Riedel's first variety-specific glassware line with a stout, solid base. The collection was created to celebrate the 50th anniversary of the Riedel family's Kufstein factory located in the Tirol province of Austria.
 2011: Developed the Escargot decanter, whose shape was inspired by a snail and was designed to double-decant wine, a Riedel-developed technology that achieves hours of decanting in a matter of minutes.

Awards and nominations
 1996: Decanter (magazine), Decanter Man of the Year, nomination    
 2006: Award of Honour for Services to the Republic of Austria 
 2007: Award of Honour by the State of Tyrol 
 2009: Wirtschaftsblatt daily newspaper Entrepreneur of the Year, nomination
 2019: Distinguished Service Award, Wine Spectator
 2019: Award of Honour by the City of Kufstein
2021: Tableware International Award of Excellence Lifetime Achievement

Personal life

An avid runner, Riedel began running at age 30 and has completed 10 marathons and undertakes mountain hiking expeditions. Riedel has been married for 41 years to his wife, Eva. They met during his time as a student in Vienna and got married in 1973. They have two children, son Maximilian J Riedel and daughter Laetizia Riedel-Rothlisberger, and 5 grandchildren.

References

1949 births
Austrian businesspeople
Glass makers
Living people